Telvyakovo is a rural locality (a village) in Kiprevskoye Rural Settlement, Kirzhachsky District, Vladimir Oblast, Russia. The population was 39 as of 2010. There are 12 streets.

Geography 
Telvyakovo is located on the Vakhchilka River, 12 km southeast of Kirzhach (the district's administrative centre) by road. Akulovo is the nearest rural locality.

References 

Rural localities in Kirzhachsky District